Elisa A. Gaudet is an American writer specializing in the Golf industry. Her first book: Two Good Rounds - 19th Hole Stories from the World’s Greatest Golfers was published in December, 2011 and chronicles the "19th hole" behaviors of several well-known professional golfers. She is also known for her syndicated sports column and blog On The Lip from which, articles have been selected for publication in The Huffington Post, New England Golf Monthly, Stratosphere private jet magazine, as well as Florida Golf Central, Alaska In flight magazine, Golfers Guide and other media outlets since 2003. She is also the founder of Women's Golf Day. A yearly global event that works to inform females of all ages about the joys of golf. Regarding to her job, Elisa spends most of her time in New York City and Florida.

Early life and career 
Born in Arlington, Massachusetts to parents Paul and Marie Gaudet, Elisa Gaudet began playing golf at the age of fourteen. After High School she attended George Mason University and received an undergraduate degree in English Writing and Art History. Gaudet then enrolled in graduate studies at Stanford in International Policy but left after two semesters to pursue a full-time modeling career. During this time she studied and lived abroad including course studies at the Sorbonne University in Paris, and Imperial College in London, and time spent modeling in Cape Town, South Africa and Tokyo, Japan. In 2000, Gaudet began working for the Tour de las Américas and went on to work for the PGA Tour in 2001. In 2003, she founded her own consulting firm "Executive Golf International" specializing in golf industry marketing, strategic partnerships, and promotions. It was at this time that she also began her ongoing blog and industry column "On The Lip". Since the mid 90s Gaudet has also been featured in miscellaneous print and television ads as a model and spokeswoman, and she also played the character of Anne Isley in the television show Nash Bridges.

References

Living people
Writers from Massachusetts
Year of birth missing (living people)